The Institute for Futures Research (IFR), established in 1974, is a research institution of the University of Stellenbosch specialising in futurology, primarily as a support service for knowledge and strategic management. The IFR's research focus is on the following fields of specialisation:

 Business futuristics and the systems approach to transformation management
 Long-term economic structure studies
 Applied demographics
 Technology foresight
 Socio-political studies
 Energy futures

External links 

1974 establishments in South Africa
Futures studies organizations
Research institutes in South Africa